Itchen may refer to:

Places in England

Administrative areas
Itchen Abbas, a village on the River Itchen about 4 miles (6.4 km) north-east of Winchester in Hampshire, England
Itchen Stoke and Ovington, an English civil parish consisting of two adjoining villages in Hampshire, England, 2 miles (3.2 km) west of Alresford
Itchen Urban District, a former local authority, now part of Southampton, Hampshire
Itchen Valley, civil parish in Hampshire
Southampton Itchen (UK Parliament constituency)

Waterways and associated locations
Itchen Bridge, a high-level hollow box girder bridge over the River Itchen in Southampton, Hampshire
Itchen Navigation, a 10.4-mile (16.7 km) disused canal system in Hampshire, England
Itchen Valley Country Park, s a country park in West End, Hampshire, England
Itchen Way, a 31.80-mile (51.18 km) long-distance footpath following the River Itchen in Hampshire, England
River Itchen, Hampshire
River Itchen, Warwickshire

Educational institutions
Itchen College, a mixed sixth form college in Bitterne, Southampton, Hampshire, England

Other uses 

 HMS Itchen, several ships of the Royal Navy

See also
Itchen ferry (disambiguation)